Lindhorst is a Samtgemeinde ("collective municipality") in the district of Schaumburg, in Lower Saxony, Germany. Its seat is in the village Lindhorst.

The Samtgemeinde Lindhorst consists of the following municipalities:
 Beckedorf 
 Heuerßen 
 Lindhorst 
 Lüdersfeld

Samtgemeinden in Lower Saxony